Darkdancer is the second studio album by Les Rythmes Digitales, released in 1999. It peaked at number 53 on the UK Albums Chart. In 2005, it was re-released with an additional disc that included remixes, unreleased tracks, and music videos.

Critical reception
In a 2005 review of the album's re-release, Paul Sullivan of BBC called it "ahead of its time" and credited it for launching much of the electro-pop vogue of the 2000s.

In 2015, Thump placed it at number 97 on the "99 Greatest Dance Albums of All Time" list.

The album was included in the book 1001 Albums You Must Hear Before You Die.

Track listing

Charts

References

External links
 

1999 albums
Wall of Sound (record label) albums
Astralwerks albums
Stuart Price albums
Synth-pop albums by English artists
Post-disco albums